Giovanni Domenico Ferracuti (mid to late17th century)  was an Italian painter, active in Macerata concentrating on landscapes, especially on wintry landscapes.

He was a follower of Gaspard Dughet and collaborated with figure painter Pier Simone Fanelli in painting for San Giorgio in Macerata.

References

Year of birth unknown
Year of death unknown
17th-century Italian painters
Italian male painters
Italian Baroque painters